The Women's Pan-American Volleyball Cup is a Continental Cup organized by NORCECA with teams from all over America (North-, South- and Central America, and the Caribbean), that served as a qualifier for the World Grand Prix. The tournament also granted places for the Final Four Women's Volleyball Cup. In 2018, the event servide as 2019 Pan American Games classification. The men have their own equivalent of the tournament, the Men's Pan-American Cup.

Results

Medal table

Teams by year

MVP by edition
2002 –  Yumilka Ruíz
2003 –  Milagros Cabral
2004 –  Zoila Barros
2005 –  Yudelkys Bautista
2006 –  Mari Steinbrecher
2007 –  Nancy Carrillo
2008 –  Sidarka Núñez
2009 –  Bethania de la Cruz
2010 –  Prisilla Rivera
2011 –  Sheilla Castro
2012 –  Kristin Richards
2013 –  Nicole Fawcett
2014 –  Brenda Castillo
2015 –  Krista Vansant
2016 –  Brayelin Martinez
2017 –  Micha Hancock
2018 –  Lauren Carlini
2019 –  Micha Hancock
2021 –  Prisilla Rivera
2022 –  Niverka Marte

See also
 Women's Junior Pan-American Volleyball Cup
 Girls' Youth Pan-American Volleyball Cup

References

External links
 NORCECA

 
 
Recurring sporting events established in 2002
International women's volleyball competitions